Berita Film Indonesia (abbreviated BFI; "Indonesian News Films") was the first government-owned film production company of Indonesia. BFI was formally established on 6 October 1945, after the Japanese occupation army surrendered, using the same equipment and studio as the Japanese studio Nippon Eigasha. The company, under RM Soetarto and Rd Ariffien, was soon forced to leave Jakarta for Surakarta and later Yogyakarta owing to the ongoing revolution against the former Dutch colonists. After the Netherlands recognised Indonesia's independence in December 1949, BFI was merged with the Dutch-owned Regerings Film Bedrijf.

The newsreels and documentaries produced by BFI covered numerous events in Indonesian history and have been reused for further works. In 1985 the company's history was dramaticised as Film dan Peristiwa (Film and Events) by Usman Effendy.

History

During the Japanese occupation of the Dutch East Indies, the Japanese appropriated the Dutch-owned Multi Film to establish the film production company Nippon Eigasha in Jakarta, the colony's capital. This included all of Multi Film's equipment, with which Nippon Eigasha produced one featured film – Berdjoang (1943) – six short films, and several newsreels. All were of propagandic nature.

The day after President Sukarno proclaimed Indonesia's independence on 17 August 1945, a number of native Indonesian employees of Nippon Eigasha formed Berita Film Indonesia (BFI), taking an Evemo-brand camera and several rolls of film. The control of Nippon Eigasha was formally transferred to the Information Ministry of the Indonesian government, under Information Minister Amir Syarifuddin on 6 October 1945, preceding a Japanese withdrawal. The venture retained the name BFI and was headed by R. M. Soetarto and Rd Ariffien. Soetarto had been a deputy director of Nippon Eigasha during the occupation, while Ariffien had directed five feature films before and during the occupation, including Berdjoang.

BFI soon began producing newsreels and documentaries. However, when the allied Dutch and British forces occupied Jakarta in November 1945, BFI and its crew began working out of a hospital; the studios were occupied by the Dutch and housed two production companies: the state-owned Regerings Film Bedrijf (RFB) and the privately held South Pacific Film Corp. By December, however, the situation had grown unsafe and BFI was moved to Surakarta, Central Java, and later Yogyakarta. BFI was one of numerous corporations, including the national government, which evacuated Jakarta and moved to Yogyakarta during this period.

In Yogyakarta, Soetarto, Ariffien, and their crew, which included Soetarto's brother Soeharto and the cameraman Sutan Nazar, continued their efforts to record historic events. Owing to the ongoing national revolution, supplies were scarce, including film stock.

After the Dutch recognised Indonesia's independence in December 1949, the Indonesian government acquired RFB. RFB and BFI were then combined into the Perusahaan Pilem Negara, later renamed Perusahaan Film Negara (State Film Company; PFN). The BFI employees stationed in Yogyakarta returned to Jakarta to work at PFN. The company, since renamed Perum Produksi Film Negara, remains incorporated  but has become inactive and may face liquidation.

Legacy
During its existence BFI produced 13 newsreels and documentaries on events including the Madiun Affair, Operation Product, Operation Kraai, and the Linggadjati and Renville Agreements. These works were the basis of several later ones, produced during the early 1950s, following Indonesia's actions during the national revolution. They were also compiled in the 1951 documentary Indonesia Fights for Freedom, distributed to the United Nations. A semi-fictional account of BFI was presented in Usman Effendy's 1985 movie Film dan Peristiwa (Film and Events).

Bibliography

Works cited

 

 
 
 

 

State-owned film companies
Mass media companies established in 1945
Mass media companies disestablished in 1950
Film production companies of Indonesia
Government-owned companies of Indonesia
Mass media in Jakarta
1945 establishments in Indonesia
1950 disestablishments in Indonesia